Nion Robert Tucker, Sr. (August 21, 1885 – April 22, 1950) was an American bobsledder who competed in the late 1920s. He won a gold medal in the five-man event at the 1928 Winter Olympics in St. Moritz. He was born in Sacramento, California and died in San Francisco, California.

References
 Birth & death information from Ancestry.com
 Bobsleigh five-man Olympic medalists for 1928
 profile

1885 births
1950 deaths
Sportspeople from Sacramento, California
American male bobsledders
Olympic gold medalists for the United States in bobsleigh
Bobsledders at the 1928 Winter Olympics
Medalists at the 1928 Winter Olympics